In a Foreign Town is the 16th studio album by the English singer-songwriter Peter Hammill. It was originally released in 1988 on Enigma Records, and was subsequently reissued on Hammill's own Fie! label.

The album has not proved popular with some of Hammill's fans, due largely to the rather dated 1980s rhythm tracks and production. However, others value it highly because it is one of Hammill's most politically engaged albums, covering such topics as apartheid ("Sun City Nightlife"), big business ("Sci-Finance (Revisited)" – a reworking of "Sci-Finance", the Van der Graaf song from Vital) and global politics ("Hemlock"). "Time to Burn" was a goodbye to Tony Stratton-Smith who had died just prior to this.

Track listing
All tracks written by Peter Hammill; except where indicated

"Hemlock"
"Invisible Ink"
"Sci-Finance (Revisited)"
"This Book" (Hammill, Gianpiero Ameli, Roberto Colombo)
"Time to Burn"
"Auto"
"Vote Brand X"
"Sun City Nightlife"
"The Play's the Thing"
"Under Cover Names"

The CD version contained two extra tracks:

"Smile" (Herbert Grönemeyer (spelled "Grönemey" on CD label), Hammill)
"Time to Burn (Instrumental)"

Personnel 
Peter Hammill – vocals, guitar, keyboards, percussion
Stuart Gordon – violin on (1)

Technical
Peter Hammill - recording engineer (Sofa Sound, Avon)
Paul Ridout – engineer, artwork
David Lord – mixing (Crescent Studios, Bath)
Paul Ridout - cover design
Armando Gallo, Hilary Hammill – photography

References

External links 
Peter Hammill's notes on the album

Peter Hammill albums
1988 albums
Enigma Records albums